Lê Văn Công (born 20 June 1984 in Hà Tĩnh Province) is a Vietnamese sports powerlifter who participated in the 2008 and crowned the men's 49 kg event at the 2016 Summer Paralympics. He became the first Vietnamese athlete to win a gold medal in the history of the Summer Paralympics. He won the silver medal in the men's 49 kg event at the 2020 Summer Paralympics held in Tokyo, Japan.

In 2017, he won the gold medal in the men's 49 kg event at the World Para Powerlifting Championships held in Mexico City, Mexico. He won the silver medal in his event at the 2021 World Para Powerlifting Championships held in Tbilisi, Georgia.

References

External links
 

1984 births
Living people
Vietnamese male weightlifters
People from Hà Tĩnh province
Medalists at the 2016 Summer Paralympics
Powerlifters at the 2016 Summer Paralympics
Paralympic gold medalists for Vietnam
Paralympic medalists in powerlifting
Paralympic powerlifters of Vietnam
Powerlifters at the 2020 Summer Paralympics
20th-century Vietnamese people
21st-century Vietnamese people